Dey is the tenth month of the Solar Hijri calendar, the official calendar of Iran and Afghanistan. It marks the start of winter. It has thirty days, beginning in December and ending in January of the Gregorian Calendar.

The associated astrological sign in the tropical zodiac is Capricorn.

The name is derived from Daθušō, "The Creator" (i.e. Ahura Mazda).

Events 
 10 - 1363 - In a public ceremony in Bandar Seri Begawan, Sultan of Brunei Hassanal Bolkiah declares Brunei as an sovereign, independent nation.
 5 - 1370 - Dissolution of the Soviet Union
 6 - 1383 - Boxing Day tsunami
9 - 1388 - Conservative counterdemonstrations during 2009–10 Iranian election protests. Commemorated by hardline figures.
 27 - 1345 - Super Bowl I held at the Los Angeles Memorial Coliseum in Los Angeles, California between the National Football League and the American Football League.

Births

Deaths 

 5 - 1351 - Harry S. Truman, 33rd President of the United States
 5 - 1385 - Gerald Ford, 38th President of the United States
 13 - 1391 - Ayatollah Mojtaba Tehrani, was an Iranian Twelver Shi'a Marja' taqlid.
 15 - 1311 - Calvin Coolidge, 30th President of the United States
 15 - 1297 - Theodore Roosevelt, 26th President of the United States

Observances 
 Khorram rooz and Feast Day of Ahura Mazda - 1 Dey
 Christmas Eve - 3 or 4 Dey
 Christmas - 4 or 5 Dey, celebrated by Christians of Iranian descent who use the Gregorian Calendar (Georgian date: December 25)
 Boxing Day - 5 or 6 Dey
 New Year's Day (Gregorian calendar) - 10 or 11 Dey
 Zartosht No-Diso - 11 Dey (Zoroastrian holiday, one of the most holy days of Zoroastrianism)
 Traditional Epiphany and Armenian Christmas - 16 or 17 Dey
 Ethiopian Christmas - 17 or 18 Dey
 Feast of the Baptism of the Lord - 23 or 24 Dey (Traditional), fourth Sunday of Dey (modern)
 Traditional Epiphany (Julian Calendar) and Timkat - 29 or 30 Dey

For those countries that observe Epiphany on the first Sunday of January following the New Year, the Solar Hijri date falls as the third Sunday of Dey.

References 

Months of the Iranian calendar